Willie Brown may refer to:

Sports

Association football
Willie Brown (footballer, born 1900) (1896/1900–1977), Scottish footballer (Rochdale AFC, Torquay United)
Willie Brown (footballer, born 1922) (1922–1978), Scottish football player (Preston North End, Grimsby Town) and manager (Barrow AFC)
Willie Brown (footballer, born 1928) (1928–2017), Scottish footballer (Forfar Athletic, Accrington Stanley)
Willie Brown (footballer, born 1938), Scottish footballer (Accrington Stanley, Chester City, Greenock Morton)
Willie Brown (footballer, born 1950), Scottish footballer (Newport County, Torquay United)

Other sports
Willie Brown (American football) (1940–2019), American football Hall-of-Fame cornerback
Willie Brown (American football, born 1942) (1942–2018), Tampa Bay Buccaneers coach
Willie Brown (golfer) (c. 1858–?), 19th century Scottish golfer
Willie Brown (rugby league), former Sydney Roosters rugby league player

Other
Willie Brown (musician) (1900–1952), American delta blues guitarist and singer
Willie Brown (politician) (born 1934), mayor of San Francisco, 1996–2004, Speaker of the California State Assembly, 1980–1995
Willie B. Brown (1940–2009), American politician in New Jersey
Willy Brown, victim of the Omaha race riot of 1919

See also
Miss Willie Brown, an American country music duo
Willie Browne (1936–2004), Irish soccer player
Jerome Brown (Willie Jerome Brown, III, 1965–1992), American football defensive tackle
William Brown (disambiguation)
Will Brown (disambiguation)
Billy Brown (disambiguation)
Bill Brown (disambiguation)